Sloboda Mićalović Ćetković (born 21 August 1981), better known as Sloboda Mićalović, is a Serbian actress. She is best known for her roles in film Zona Zamfirova and television series M(j)ešoviti brak and Ranjeni orao.

Early and personal life 
Sloboda Mićalović was born on 21 August 1981 in Leskovac, Yugoslavia. She is a daughter of actor Dragan Mićalović, and has two sisters, Mirjana and Dragana. As a child, Mićalović wanted to be an opera singer and took serious singing lessons.

Mićalović is a close friend of actresses Zorana Bečić and Ana Franić. In 2008 she married fellow actor Vojin Ćetković in Belgrade and took his surname, thus she is commonly dubbed Sloboda Mićalović–Ćetković.
In February 2010 she gave birth to twin girls, Mila and Vera. The couple and their children live in Novi Beograd, Belgrade.

Career 
Mićalović began her career on stage. After small roles on film and television, she made her breakthrough with the role of Vaske in 2002 film Zona Zamfirova, starring Katarina Radivojević and Vojin Ćetković. Mićalović then portrayed Jelena Čađenović in the RTV Pink television series M(j)ešoviti brak, starring Milutin Karadžić and Dara Džokić, from 2003 to 2007. In 2007 and 2008 she acted in Serbo-Croatian television series Ne daj se, Nina, a version of telenovela Yo soy Betty, la fea, and also appeared as Queen Natalija Obrenović in television film Kraljevina Srbija.

In 2008 and 2009 Mićalović starred in the RTS television series Ranjeni orao, which became the most-watched Serbian television series of all time. She was also considered for the role of Katarina in 2009 film Sveti Georgije ubiva aždahu, eventually given to Nataša Janjić.
In 2011/2012 she starred in television series Nepobedivo srce.

Filmography 
{| class="wikitable" style="font-size: 90%;"
! colspan="4" style="background: LightSteelBlue;" | Film
|-
! Year
! Film
! Role
! Notes
|-
| rowspan="3" | 2002
| Klasa 2002
| Cameo Appearance
| Television Film
|-
| Zona Zamfirova
| Vaska
|
|-
| Ko čeka dočeka
| Cameo Appearance
| rowspan="2" | Television Film
|-
| 2003
| Ilka
| Draga
|-
| 2004
| Pljačka Trećeg rajha
| Sana
|
|-
| 2008
| Kraljevina Srbija
| Queen Natalija Obrenović
| Television Film
|-
| 2016
| Santa Maria della Salute
| Olga Dunđerski
| 
|-
|-
!' colspan="4" style="background: LightSteelBlue;" | Television
|-
! Year !! Title !! Role !! Notes
|-
| 2002
| Podijum| Emanuela
| 
|-
| 2003
| Laku noć, deco| Herself
| Guest Appearance
|-
| 2003—2007
| M(j)ešoviti brak| Jelena Čađenović
|
|-
| 2004
| Tragom Karađorđa| Jelena
|
|-
| 2007—2008
| Ne daj se, Nina| Vanesa Tintor
|
|-
| 2008—2009
| Ranjeni orao| Anđelka Bojanić
| Main role
|-
| 2015
| Čizmaši| Sofija
|
|-
| 2017
| Nemanjići — rađanje kraljevine| Anna Dandolo
|
|}

 Discography 

 Soundtrack albums 
 2002 — Zona Zamfirova''

References

External links 
 

1981 births
Living people
People from Leskovac
Serbian film actresses
Serbian stage actresses
Serbian television actresses
Dr. Branivoj Đorđević Award winners
21st-century Serbian actresses